Valle de Juárez is a town and municipality, in Jalisco in central-western Mexico. The municipality covers an area of 91.38 km².

In 2005, the municipality had a total population of 5,218.

References

Municipalities of Jalisco